Poland is a village in Kiribati, located on the island of Kiritimati, within the archipelago of Line Islands. In 2020, it was inhabited by 404 people, making it the smallest of the four settlements of the island.

The village was named by  after the birth country of his Polish plantation manager and engineer Stanisław Pełczyński, who aided the villagers. He solved the problem of effectively watering palm trees during the dry season by suggesting a modified irrigation system, then helping to build it, and teaching how to use it.

The village was featured in one of the promotional videos for the 2013 United Nations Climate Change Conference in Warsaw, Poland.

Location 
Poland is located on the westernmost part of the island, at geographic coordinates .

Demographics
At the time of the 2010 census, the population is 441 people.

Name 
The village was named in honor of a Pole whose name was Stanisław (Stanislaus) Pełczyński.  Having arrived with an American merchant vessel that was plying the copra trade at a time, when the local inhabitants were having difficulties irrigating their palm tree plantations, Stanisław helped them solve the problem. Accordingly, the village was renamed to its present-day name in his honor. Also, a church was built there and dedicated under the auspices of Stanislaus Kostka, and a bay in the lagoon was named Saint Stanislaus Bay.

Education 
There is a primary school with three main teachers and 45 students.

References

Sources 
R. Antoszewski: "Pacyficzna Polska", Kurioza naukowe/Scientific curiosities, ISSN 1176-7545; year VI; No 1033. April 2005, v.55. On the web: 2005-05-29. Titirangi, Auckland, Nowa Zelandia. Link accessed on 2007-10-04. 
Wojciech Dąbrowski: "Od Kiribati do Nauru". Link accessed on 2007-10-04. 
The 5/6 class of the Poland Primary School and the headteacher at Poland Primary School.

External links
 I CARE FOR POLAND - a short documentary about village Poland in Kiribati
Wojciech Dąbrowski: Homepage of the Polish world traveller Wojciech Dąbrowski. Link accessed on 2007-10-04. 

Populated places in Kiribati
Kiritimati